Natalie Harrowell (9 February 1990 – 10 December 2019) was an English rugby league player who played in the first-ever Women's Super League Grand Final in 2017. Harrowell played for Featherstone Rovers and was regarded as a "key member of the women's club team", she also held 3 caps for England Rugby League. She was admitted to the hospital with a virus and died on 10 December 2019.

References

External links
https://www.mirror.co.uk/news/uk-news/rugby-league-star-killed-virus-21088733

1990 births
2019 deaths
Place of death missing
Place of birth missing
English female rugby league players
England women's national rugby league team players
Infectious disease deaths in England